Bellamkonda Sai Sreenivas (born 3 January 1993) is an Indian actor who works in Telugu films. Son of film producer Bellamkonda Suresh, he made his debut with the action comedy film Alludu Seenu (2014) which won him Filmfare Award for Best Male Debut – South. He is making his Hindi debut with the remake of 2005 Blockbuster Telugu movie Chatrapathi.

Career
Bellamkonda Sai Sreenivas is the son of Telugu film producer Bellamkonda Suresh. He finished acting course at Lee Strasberg Theatre and Film Institute at Los Angeles (USA) and Barry John Acting Studio at Mumbai (India). He also underwent professional training in Vietnam for martial arts and stunts. His younger brother Ganesh Bellamkonda is set to make his Tollywood debut as an actor.

Sreenivas made his debut in the 2014 Telugu film Alludu Seenu opposite Samantha Ruth Prabhu along with Prakash Raj. After the success of the film, he starred in Speedunnodu, a Telugu remake of the Tamil superhit film Sundarapandian, along with Sonarika Bhadoria and Prakash Raj. He also featured in Jaya Janaki Nayaka opposite Rakul Preet Singh, Saakshyam opposite  Pooja Hegde, Kavacham opposite Kajal Aggarwal and Mehreen Pirzada and  Sita again opposite Kajal Aggarwal. He also starred in Rakshasudu, the Telugu remake of the Tamil blockbuster film Ratsasan, opposite Anupama Parameswaran. In 2021, he starred in Alludu Adhurs with Nabha Natesh and Anu Emmanuel.

In November 2020, the Hindi remake of the Telugu film Chatrapathi (2005) was announced, which would mark his Bollywood debut. V. V. Vinayak is signed as its director. In August 2021, he announced his next film titled Stuartpuram Donga. The movie chronicles the life of notorious thief Tiger Nageswara Rao of Stuartpuram.

Filmography

Awards and nominations

See also 

 List of Telugu actors

References

External links

 
 

1993 births
Indian male film actors
Living people
Male actors in Telugu cinema
People from Guntur district
Male actors from Andhra Pradesh
Telugu male actors